András Doleschall (born 27 January 1959) is a Hungarian sports shooter. He competed at the 1980 Summer Olympics and the 1988 Summer Olympics.

References

1959 births
Living people
Hungarian male sport shooters
Olympic shooters of Hungary
Shooters at the 1980 Summer Olympics
Shooters at the 1988 Summer Olympics
Sport shooters from Budapest
20th-century Hungarian people